"Moloko" (stylized as moLOko) is a song by Ukrainian singer Loboda, released on 18 December 2020 by Sony Music Entertainment. It is known that the song will be included in the Loboda's upcoming album.

In April 2021 the single received Platinum certification in Russia.

Music video 
The music video for the song was released the same day. It was directed by Alan Badoev. According to Loboda, the concept of the video took more than four months to develop. The plot of the video shows a family drama that leads a girl to prison. The heroines of the video express their feelings with the help of bright dances. During the first day, the video gained more than one and a half million views.

On the night of 21-22 December, the video was removed from YouTube. Soon the video was restored, and the singer and her producer assured that the perpetrators will be punished.

Promotion 
Loboda visited several radio stations and TV channels in Ukraine to promote the single. Including Russkoye Radio (Happy Yolka 2020) and the music TV channel M1 (Ministerstvo Premyer). In Russia the was song performed on 31 December 2020 on Channel One's show Novogodny maskarad.

Awards and nominations

Track listing

Charts

Weekly charts

Monthly charts

Year-end charts

References

2020 singles
2020 songs
Russian-language songs
Sony Music singles
Svetlana Loboda songs